Xenodon severus is a species of snake in the family Dipsadidae. It is found in South America.

References 

Reptiles described in 1758
Taxa named by Carl Linnaeus
Colubrids
Snakes of South America